Ruiz's marsupial frog (Gastrotheca ruizi) is a species of frog in the family Hemiphractidae.
It is endemic to Colombia.
Its natural habitats are subtropical or tropical moist montane forests, freshwater marshes, and intermittent freshwater marshes.
It is threatened by habitat loss.

Sources

Gastrotheca
Amphibians of Colombia
Amphibians described in 1986
Taxonomy articles created by Polbot